The poise (symbol P) is the unit of dynamic viscosity (absolute viscosity) in the centimetre–gram–second system of units (CGS). It is named after Jean Léonard Marie Poiseuille (see Hagen–Poiseuille equation). The centipoise (1 cP = 0.01 P) is more commonly used than the poise itself.

The analogous unit in the International System of Units is the pascal-second (Pa⋅s):

The poise is often used with the metric prefix centi- because the viscosity of water at 20 °C (standard conditions for temperature and pressure) is almost exactly 1 centipoise. A centipoise is one hundredth of a poise, or one millipascal-second (mPa⋅s) in SI units (1 cP = 10−3 Pa⋅s = 1 mPa⋅s).

The CGS symbol for the centipoise is cP. The abbreviations cps, cp, and cPs are sometimes seen.

Liquid water has a viscosity of 0.00890 P at 25 °C at a pressure of 1 atmosphere (0.00890 P = 0.890 cP = 0.890 mPa⋅s).

See also

 Poiseuille
 Viscosity

References

Centimetre–gram–second system of units
Units of dynamic viscosity

et:Poise